FC Rukh Lviv is a Ukrainian professional football club based in Lviv. The club competes in the Ukrainian Premier League following the promotion as runners-up of 2019–20 Ukrainian First League.

History

In 2003 under the initiative Myron Markevych, who was born in Vynnyky, and at the time was head coach of FC Karpaty Lviv established football club called FC Rukh Vynnyky. When asked why Rukh, Markevych replied that Rukh is life. In June 2003, a children's football school Myron Markevych "Movement" under directorship Yuriy Hdanskyi and trainers Roman Hdanskyi, Ihor Didyk, Markiyan Shkraba, Oleh Lehan was formed.

In 2009, the Rukh adult soccer team with President  and head trainer Roman Hdanskyi was formed. Since the team was located in Vynnyky which is a satellite town of the city of Lviv, so at a time teams participated separately in Lviv Oblast League Championship and in Lviv the teams participated in the championship of the city.
The club holds matches at the stadium named after Bohdan Markevych (1925–2002, Myron Markevych's father), who was one of the main sponsors of the football club and the Youth Academy, who worked for many years as a junior's coach.

In 2014, the team won the National amateur football championship.

During the 2015 season, the club made sensations by signing former Dynamo Kyiv internationals Oleksandr Aliyev and Maksim Shatskikh.

The club has been admitted to the PFL and took second place in the 2016–17 Ukrainian Second League.

On 26 June 2017, the club presented a new emblem in golden and black colors.

Honors
Ukrainian First League
Runners-up (1): 2019–20
Ukrainian Second League
Runners-up (1): 2016–17
 Ukrainian Amateur League
 Winners (1): 2014
 Runners-up (2): 2013, 2015
 Lviv Oblast Championship
Winners (4): 2012, 2013, 2014, 2015
 Lviv Oblast Cup
Winners (3): 2012, 2014. 2015

Squad
Updated as of 6 March 2023

Out on loan

Coaches and administration

League and cup history

{|class="wikitable"
|-bgcolor="#efefef"
! Season
! Div.
! Pos.
! Pl.
! W
! D
! L
! GS
! GA
! P
!Cup
!colspan=2|Other
!Notes
|-bgcolor=SteelBlue
|align=center rowspan=2|2013
|align=center rowspan=2|4th
|align=center|1
|align=center|10
|align=center|7
|align=center|2
|align=center|1
|align=center|20
|align=center|6
|align=center|23
|align=center|
|align=center|
|align=center|
|align=center|
|-bgcolor=SteelBlue
|align=center|1
|align=center|4
|align=center|3
|align=center|1
|align=center|0
|align=center|7
|align=center|3
|align=center|10
|align=center|
|align=center|
|align=center|
|align=center bgcolor=silver|Runners up
|-bgcolor=SteelBlue
|align=center rowspan=2|2014
|align=center rowspan=2|4th
|align=center|1
|align=center|8
|align=center|5
|align=center|1
|align=center|2
|align=center|17
|align=center|8
|align=center|16
|align=center rowspan=2|
|align=center rowspan=2|
|align=center rowspan=2|
|align=center|
|-bgcolor=SteelBlue
|align=center|1
|align=center|4
|align=center|3
|align=center|1
|align=center|0
|align=center|5
|align=center|2
|align=center|10
|align=center bgcolor=gold|Champions
|-bgcolor=SteelBlue
|align=center rowspan=3|2015
|align=center rowspan=3|4th
|align=center|1
|align=center|6 	
|align=center|4 	
|align=center|1 	
|align=center|1 	
|align=center|10 	
|align=center|6 	
|align=center|13
|align=center rowspan=3|
|align=center rowspan=3|AC
|align=center rowspan=3| finals
|align=center|
|-bgcolor=SteelBlue
|align=center|1
|align=center|10 	
|align=center|8 	
|align=center|2 	
|align=center|0 	
|align=center|15 	
|align=center|4 	
|align=center|26
|align=center|
|-bgcolor=SteelBlue
|align=center|1
|align=center|3 		
|align=center|3 	 	
|align=center|0 	
|align=center|0 		
|align=center|8 	 	
|align=center|1 	  	 	
|align=center|9
|align=center bgcolor=silver|Runners up
|-bgcolor=PowderBlue
|align=center|2016–17
|align=center|3rd
|align=center bgcolor=silver|2/17
|align=center|32
|align=center|23
|align=center|5
|align=center|4
|align=center|68
|align=center|24
|align=center|74
|align=center| finals
|align=center|
|align=center|
|align=center bgcolor=lightgreen|Promoted
|-bgcolor=LightCyan
|align=center|2017–18
|align=center|2nd
|align=center|7/18
|align=center| 34 
|align=center| 14  
|align=center| 	9 
|align=center| 11  
|align=center| 36 			
|align=center| 	30  
|align=center|51 	
|align=center| finals
|align=center|
|align=center|
|align=center|
|-bgcolor=LightCyan
|align=center|2018–19
|align=center|2nd
|align=center|11/15
|align=center|28
|align=center|8
|align=center|10
|align=center|10
|align=center|35
|align=center|35
|align=center|34
|align=center| finals
|align=center|
|align=center|
|align=center|
|-bgcolor=LightCyan
|align=center|2019–20
|align=center|2nd
|align=center bgcolor=silver|2/16
|align=center|30
|align=center|18
|align=center|7
|align=center|5
|align=center|51
|align=center|21
|align=center|61
|align=center| finals
|align=center|
|align=center|
|align=center bgcolor=lightgreen|Promoted
|- 
|align=center|2020–21
|align=center|1st
|align=center|10/14
|align=center|26 	
|align=center|6 	
|align=center|10 	
|align=center|10 	
|align=center|27 	
|align=center|39 
|align=center|28
|align=center| finals
|align=center|
|align=center|
|align=center|
|- 
|align=center|2021–22
|align=center|1st
|align=center|11/16
|align=center|17
|align=center|4
|align=center|6
|align=center|7
|align=center|16
|align=center|21
|align=center|18
|align=center| finals
|align=center|
|align=center|
|align=center|
|- 
|align=center|2022–23
|align=center|1st
|align=center| /16
|align=center|
|align=center|
|align=center|
|align=center|
|align=center|
|align=center|
|align=center|
|align=center|
|align=center|
|align=center|
|align=center|
|}

Coaches

References

External links
 The video presentation of the new emblem of "Rukh" (Відеопрезентація нової емблеми "Руху").

 
Ukrainian Premier League clubs
Association football clubs established in 2003
2003 establishments in Ukraine
Football clubs in Lviv
Sports team relocations